Omar Assad (aka Omar As'ad) was an 80-year-old Palestinian-American man who died on 12 January 2022 in the custody of Israeli forces. He was detained by troops from the Netzah Yehuda Battalion at a checkpoint at the village of Jilijliya, north of Ramallah. He was handcuffed, gagged and forced to lie on his stomach for between 20 minutes and an hour, dying from a stress-induced cardiac arrest. U.S. State Department spokesman Ned Price said U.S. officials requested "clarification" of events from Israel, saying "We support a thorough investigation into the circumstances." The Israeli authorities announced an investigation.
 An army report called the incident a "moral failure and poor decision-making."

Subsequently, the U.S. State Department showed particular interest in the Netzah Yehuda battalion. Hady Amr, the administration's point person on Israel-Palestine, visited Assad's family and the U.S. Embassy in Israel was asked to prepare a report on the battalion.

On 9 October, Israel's defense ministry said it would pay the family of the deceased 500,000 shekels (US$141,000) On 16 October, the family of the deceased said they rejected compensation offered in return for dismissing a lawsuit they had submitted before US and Israeli courts.

On 10 November 2022, the Israeli military's legal authority said it is preparing to indict two officers, one who commanded the force at the checkpoint and another in charge of guarding detainees. At the end of November, Israel announced that the Netzah Yehuda battalion would be reassigned from the West Bank but denied that the move related to controversial incidents over the past year including the death of Assad.

See also 
Timeline of the Israeli–Palestinian conflict in 2022

References 

Palestinian American
Deaths in the Palestinian territories